Virieu, also Virieu-sur-Bourbre (literally Virieu on Bourbre), is a former commune in the Isère department in southeastern France. On 1 January 2019, it was merged into the new commune Val-de-Virieu.

Geography
The small river Bourbre forms most of the commune's western border.

Population

See also
Communes of the Isère department

References

External links
 Official site 
 Chateau de Virieu 

Former communes of Isère
Isère communes articles needing translation from French Wikipedia